Eugene Joly de Sabla Jr. (January 20, 1865 – January 18, 1956) was a co-founder of Pacific Gas and Electric Company.

He was born in Panama, on January 20, 1865.

In 1905, de Sabla and his partner John Martin consolidated their holdings and incorporated as Pacific Gas and Electric Company (PG&E).

De Sabla died on January 18, 1956, at his home at 200 East Seventy-eighth Street in New York City, two days before his 91st birthday.

References

American company founders
American energy industry executives